Method acting, informally known as The Method, is a range of training and rehearsal techniques, as formulated by a number of different theatre practitioners, that seeks to encourage sincere and expressive performances through identifying with, understanding, and experiencing a character's inner motivation and emotions. These techniques are built on Stanislavski's system, developed by the Russian actor and director Konstantin Stanislavski and captured in his books An Actor Prepares, Building a Character, and Creating a Role.

Among those who have contributed to the development of the Method, three teachers are associated with "having set the standard of its success", each emphasizing different aspects of the approach: Lee Strasberg (the psychological aspects), Stella Adler (the sociological aspects), and Sanford Meisner (the behavioral aspects). The approach was first developed when they worked together at the Group Theatre in New York and later at the Actors Studio. Notable method actors include Marlon Brando, James Dean, Daniel Day-Lewis, and Robert De Niro.

History and development 

"The Method" is an elaboration of the "system" of acting developed by the Russian theatre practitioner Konstantin Stanislavski. In the first three decades of the 20th century, Stanislavski organized his training, preparation, and rehearsal techniques into a coherent, systematic methodology. The "method" brought together and built on: (1) the director-centred, unified aesthetic and disciplined, ensemble approach of the Meiningen company; (2) the actor-centred realism of the Maly; (3) and the naturalistic staging of Antoine and the independent theatre movement.

The "system" cultivates what Stanislavski calls the "art of experiencing", to which he contrasts the "art of representation". It mobilizes the actor's conscious thought and will, in order to activate other, less-controllable psychological processes, like emotional experience and subconscious behavior, both sympathetically and indirectly. In rehearsal, the actor searches for inner motives to justify action and the definition of what the character seeks to achieve at any given moment (a "task"). Later, Stanislavski further elaborated the "system" with a more physically grounded rehearsal process, which is known as the "Method of Physical Action". Minimizing at-the-table discussions, he now encouraged an "active analysis", in which the sequence of dramatic situations are improvised. "The best analysis of a play", Stanislavski argued, "is to take action in the given circumstances."

As well as Stanislavski's early work, the ideas and techniques of Yevgeny Vakhtangov (a Russian-Armenian student who had died in 1922 at age 39) were also an important influence on the development of the Method. Vakhtangov's "object exercises" were developed further by Uta Hagen as a means for actor training and the maintenance of skills. Strasberg attributed to Vakhtangov the distinction between Stanislavski's process of "justifying" behavior with the inner motivational forces that prompt that behavior in the character and the "motivating" behavior with imagined or recalled experiences relating to the actor and substituted for those relating to the character. Following this distinction, actors ask themselves "What would motivate me, the actor, to behave in the way the character does?" The contrast is the Stanislavskian question, "Given the particular circumstances of the play, how would I behave, what would I do, how would I feel, how would I react?"

United States 

In the United States, the transmission of the earliest phase of Stanislavski's work via the students of the First Studio of the Moscow Art Theatre (MAT) revolutionized acting in the West. When the MAT toured the US in the early 1920s, Richard Boleslawski, one of Stanislavski's students from the First Studio, presented a series of lectures on the "system" that were eventually published as Acting: The First Six Lessons (1933). The interest generated led to a decision by Boleslawski and Maria Ouspenskaya (another student at the First Studio who later became an acting teacher) to emigrate to the US and to establish the American Laboratory Theatre.

However, the version of Stanislavski's practice these students took to the US with them was that developed in the 1910s, rather than the more fully elaborated version of the "system" detailed in Stanislavski's acting manuals from the 1930s, An Actor's Work and An Actor's Work on a Role. The first half of An Actor's Work, which treated the psychological elements of training, was published in a heavily abridged and misleadingly translated version in the US as An Actor Prepares in 1936. English-language readers often confused the first volume on psychological processes with the "system" as a whole. Many of the American practitioners who came to be identified with the Method were taught by Boleslawski and Ouspenskaya at the American Laboratory Theatre. The approaches to acting subsequently developed by their students—including Lee Strasberg, Stella Adler, and Sanford Meisner—are often confused with Stanislavski's "system".

Stella Adler, an actress and acting teacher whose students included Marlon Brando, Warren Beatty, and Robert De Niro, also broke with Strasberg after she studied with Stanislavski. Her version of the method is based on the idea that actors should stimulate emotional experience by imagining the scene's "given circumstances", rather than recalling experiences from their own lives. Adler's approach also seeks to stimulate the actor's imagination through the use of "as ifs", which substitute more personally affecting imagined situations for the circumstances experienced by the character.

Alfred Hitchcock described his work with Montgomery Clift in I Confess as difficult "because you know, he was a method actor". He recalled similar problems with Paul Newman in Torn Curtain. Lillian Gish quipped: "It's ridiculous. How would you portray death if you had to experience it first?" Charles Laughton, who worked closely for a time with Bertolt Brecht, argued that "Method actors give you a photograph", while "real actors give you an oil painting."

During the filming of Marathon Man (1976), Laurence Olivier, who had lost patience with Method acting two decades earlier while filming The Prince and the Showgirl (1957), was said to have quipped to Dustin Hoffman, after Hoffman stayed up all night to match his character's situation, that Hoffman should "try acting ... It's so much easier." In an interview on Inside the Actors Studio, Hoffman said that this story had been distorted: he had been up all night at the Studio 54 nightclub for personal rather than professional reasons and Olivier, who understood this, was joking.

Strasberg's students included many prominent American actors of the latter half of the 20th century, including Paul Newman, Al Pacino, George Peppard, Dustin Hoffman, James Dean, Marilyn Monroe, Jane Fonda, Jack Nicholson, and Mickey Rourke.

India 
In Indian cinema, a form of Method acting was developed independently from American cinema. Dilip Kumar, a Hindi cinema actor who debuted in the 1940s and eventually became one of the biggest Indian movie stars of the 1950s and 1960s, was a pioneer of this technique, predating Hollywood Method actors such as Marlon Brando. Kumar inspired many future Indian actors, including Amitabh Bachchan, Naseeruddin Shah,Nawazuddin Siddiqui, Deepika Padukone and Priyanka Chopra . Kumar, who pioneered his own form of method acting without any acting school experience, was described as "the ultimate method actor" by filmmaker Satyajit Ray.

Method acting is being discussed more in India with the rise of OTT streaming platforms that feature several popular web series exploring genres seldom featured in Indian cinema. The increasing viewership of these platforms has given space to the next generation of method actors in India, including Rajkumar Rao, Amit Sadh,Pawan Kalyan, Ranveer Singh , Ali Fazal and Vicky Kaushal.

Techniques 
Among the concepts and techniques of Method acting are substitution, "as if", sense memory, affective memory, and animal work (all of which were first developed by Stanislavski). Contemporary Method actors sometimes seek help from psychologists in the development of their roles.

In Strasberg's approach, actors make use of experiences from their own lives to bring them closer to the experience of their characters. This technique, which Stanislavski came to call emotion memory (Strasberg tends to use the alternative formulation, "affective memory"), involves the recall of sensations involved in experiences that made a significant emotional impact on the actor. Without faking or forcing, actors allow those sensations to stimulate a response and try not to inhibit themselves.

Stanislavski's approach rejected emotion memory except as a last resort and prioritized physical action as an indirect pathway to emotional expression. This can be seen in Stanislavki's notes for Leonidov in the production plan for Othello and in Benedetti's discussion of his training of actors at home and later abroad. Stanislavski confirmed this emphasis in his discussions with Harold Clurman in late 1935.

In training, as distinct from rehearsal process, the recall of sensations to provoke emotional experience and the development of a vividly imagined fictional experience remained a central part both of Stanislavski's and the various Method-based approaches that developed out of it.

A widespread misconception about Method acting—particularly in the popular media—equates Method actors with actors who choose to remain in character even offstage or off-camera for the duration of a project. In his book A Dream of Passion, Strasberg wrote that Stanislavski, early in his directing career, "require[d] his actors to live 'in character' off stage", but that "the results were never fully satisfactory". Stanislavski did experiment with this approach in his own acting before he became a professional actor and founded the Moscow Art Theatre, though he soon abandoned it. Some Method actors employ this technique, such as Daniel Day-Lewis, but Strasberg did not include it as part of his teachings and it "is not part of the Method approach".

While Strasberg focused on the memory-recall aspect of the method, Adler's approach centered on the idea that actors should find truth in the script, inner emotions, experiences, and circumstances of the character. Her teachings have been carried on through Larry Moss, a successor and student of Adler. Moss is the author of the acting textbook The Intent to Live, in which he maintains the basic training of Adler's techniques. The book introduces "given circumstances", which are the facts about the character given in the script, and "interpretation", which is the truths about the character not given in the script. This constitutes the actor's assumptions about the character they are playing.

According to Moss, there are three things that an actor needs to know about their character to find truth in their performance. These things are objectives, obstacles, and intentions. The "objective" is what a character needs to fulfill in a given scene. The "super objective" is the character's wishes or dreams throughout the entire story. "Obstacle" is what stands in the way of the character's objectives. "Intention" comprises the actions a character takes to overcome obstacles and achieve objectives. Moss advocates the position that if an actor understands these facts about their character, they will be able to find truth in their performance, creating a realistic presentation. Moss emphasizes this by claiming that the actor does not want to become the character, rather, the character lives through the actor's justification of the character's truths within themselves.

Psychological effects 

When the felt emotions of a played character are not compartmentalized, they can encroach on other facets of life, often seeming to disrupt the actor's psyche. This occurs as the actor delves into previous emotional experiences, be they joyful or traumatic. The psychological effects, like emotional fatigue, come when suppressed or unresolved raw emotions are dredged up to add to the character, not just from employing personal emotions in performance.

Fatigue, or emotional fatigue, comes mainly when actors "create dissonance between their actions and their actual feelings". A mode of acting referred to as "surface acting" involves only changing one's actions without altering the deeper thought processes. Method acting, when employed correctly, is mainly deep acting, or changing thoughts as well as actions, proven to generally avoid excessive fatigue. Surface acting is statistically "positively associated with a negative mood and this explains some of the association of surface acting with increased emotional exhaustion". This negative mood that is created leads to fear, anxiety, feelings of shame and sleep deprivation.

Raw emotion (unresolved emotions conjured up for acting) may result in sleep deprivation and the cyclical nature of the ensuing side effects. Sleep deprivation alone can lead to impaired function, causing some individuals to have "acute episodes of psychosis". Sleep deprivation initiates chemical changes in the brain that can lead to behavior similar to psychotic individuals. These episodes can lead to more lasting psychological damage. In cases where raw emotion that has not been resolved, or traumas have been evoked before closure has been reached by the individual, the emotion can result in greater emotional instability and an increased sense of anxiety, fear or shame.

See also 

 Ivana Chubbuck
 Ion Cojar
 Sanford Meisner
 Konstantin Stanislavski
 Lee Strasberg
 List of acting techniques

Notes

Sources

Primary sources 

 Adler, Stella. 2000. The Art of Acting. Ed. Howard Kissel. New York: Applause. .
 Adler, Stella. 1990. The Technique of Acting. New York: Bantam. .
 Hagen, Uta and Haskel Frankel. 1973. Respect for Acting. New York: Macmillan. .
 Hagen, Uta. 1991. A Challenge for the Actor. New York: Scribner. .
 Meisner, Sanford, and Dennis Longwell. 1987. Sanford Meisner on Acting. New York: Vintage. .
 Stanislavski, Konstantin. 1936. An Actor Prepares. London: Methuen, 1988. .
 Stanislavski, Konstantin. 1938. An Actor's Work: A Student's Diary. Trans. and ed. Jean Benedetti. London and New York: Routledge, 2008. .
 Stanislavski, Konstantin. 1957. An Actor's Work on a Role. Trans. and ed. Jean Benedetti. London and New York: Routledge, 2010. .
 Strasberg, Lee. 1965. Strasberg at the Actors Studio: Tape-Recorded Sessions. Ed. Robert H. Hethmon. New York: Theater Communications Group.
 Strasberg, Lee. 1987. A Dream of Passion: The Development of the Method. Ed. Evangeline Morphos. New York: Plume, 1988. .
 Strasberg, Lee. 2010. The Lee Strasberg Notes. Ed. Lola Cohen. London: Routledge. .

Secondary sources 

 Abramson, Leslie H. 2015. Hitchcock and the Anxiety of Authorship.. New York: Palgrave. .
 Banham, Martin, ed. 1998. The Cambridge Guide to Theatre. Cambridge: Cambridge UP. .
 Benedetti, Jean. 1989. Stanislavski: An Introduction. Revised edition. Original edition published in 1982. London: Methuen. .
 Benedetti, Jean. 1998. Stanislavski and the Actor. London: Methuen. .
 Benedetti, Jean. 1999a. Stanislavski: His Life and Art. Revised edition. Original edition published in 1988. London: Methuen. .
 Benedetti, Jean. 1999b. "Stanislavsky and the Moscow Art Theatre, 1898–1938". In Leach and Borovsky (1999, 254–277).
 Blum, Richard A. 1984. American Film Acting: The Stanislavski Heritage. Studies in Cinema 28. Ann Arbor, MI: UMI Press.
 Braun, Edward. 1982. "Stanislavsky and Chekhov". The Director and the Stage: From Naturalism to Grotowski. London: Methuen. . p. 59–76.
 Carnicke, Sharon M. 1998. Stanislavsky in Focus. Russian Theatre Archive Ser. London: Harwood Academic Publishers. .
 Carnicke, Sharon M. 2000. "Stanislavsky's System: Pathways for the Actor". In Hodge (2000, 11–36).
 Carnicke, Sharon M. 2009. Stanislavsky in Focus: An Acting Master for the Twenty-First Century. 2nd ed. of Carnicke (1998). Routledge Theatre Classics. London: Routledge. .
 Counsell, Colin. 1996. Signs of Performance: An Introduction to Twentieth-Century Theatre. London and New York: Routledge. .
 Daily Telegraph, The. 2013. "The Method Madness of Daniel Day-Lewis". The Daily Telegraph 23 January 2013. Web. Accessed 13 August 2016.
 Encyclopædia Britannica. 2013. "Stella Adler (American Actress)". Encyclopædia Britannica Online. Web. 27 October 2011.
 Flom, Eric L. 2009. Silent Film Stars on the Stages of Seattle: A History of Performances by Hollywood Notables. Jefferson, NC: McFarland. .
 French, Philip. 2008. "Philip French's Screen Legends: Charles Laughton". The Guardian. 21 September 2008. Web. Accessed 31 August 2016.
 Gallagher-Ross, Jacob. 2018. "Theaters of the Everyday". Evanston: Northwestern University Press..
 Golub, Spencer. 1998. "Stanislavsky, Konstantin (Sergeevich)". In Banham (1998, 1032–1033).
 Gordon, Marc. 2000. "Salvaging Strasberg at the Fin de Siècle". In Krasner (2000, 43–60).
 Gordon, Robert. 2006. The Purpose of Playing: Modern Acting Theories in Perspective. Ann Arbor: U of Michigan P. .
 Gussow, Mel. 1982. "Obituary: Lee Strasberg of Actors Studio Dead". The New York Times 18 February 1982. Web. Accessed 4 March 2014.
 Hayward, Susan. 1996. Key Concepts in Cinema Studies. Key Concepts ser. London: Routledge. .
 Hodge, Alison, ed. 2000. Twentieth-Century Actor Training. London and New York: Routledge. .
 Hull, S. Loraine. 1985. Strasberg's Method as Taught by Lorrie Hull. Woodbridge, CN: Ox Bow. .
 Innes, Christopher, ed. 2000. A Sourcebook on Naturalist Theatre. London and New York: Routledge. .
 Kase, Larina. 2011. Clients, Clients, and More Clients!: Create an Endless Stream of New Business with the Power of Psychology. New York: McGraw–Hill. .
 Krasner, David, ed. 2000a. Method Acting Reconsidered: Theory, Practice, Future. New York: St. Martin's P. .
 Krasner, David. 2000b. "Strasberg, Adler, Meisner: Method Acting". In Hodge (2000, 129–150).
 Leach, Robert. 2004. Makers of Modern Theatre: An Introduction. London: Routledge. .
 Leach, Robert, and Victor Borovsky, eds. 1999. A History of Russian Theatre. Cambridge: Cambridge UP. .
 Lewis, Robert. 2003. Slings and Arrows: Theater in My Life. New York: Hal Leonard Corporation. .
 Magarshack, David. 1950. Stanislavsky: A Life. London and Boston: Faber, 1986. .
 Milling, Jane, and Graham Ley. 2001. Modern Theories of Performance: From Stanislavski to Boal. Basingstoke, Hampshire and New York: Palgrave. .
 Roach, Joseph R. 1985. The Player's Passion: Studies in the Science of Acting. Theater:Theory/Text/Performance Ser. Ann Arbor: U of Michigan P. .
 Skog, Jason. 2010. Acting: A Practical Guide to Pursuing the Art. Mankato, MN: Compass Point. .
 Toporkov, Vasily Osipovich. 2001. Stanislavski in Rehearsal: The Final Years. Trans. Jean Benedetti. London: Methuen. .
 Whyman, Rose. 2008. The Stanislavsky System of Acting: Legacy and Influence in Modern Performance. Cambridge: Cambridge UP. .

Acting techniques
Theatre
1933 introductions